Du Quartier is an unopened Réseau express métropolitain station in the city of Brossard, Quebec, Canada. It will be operated by CDPQ Infra and serves as a station on the central (southern) branch of the REM. The opening is slated for the second quarter of 2023.

It is right across from the Quartier DIX30 lifestyle center, located on the southern side of Autoroute 10 just to the southeast of Boulevard du Quartier overpass, and will be connected to a large future transit-oriented development of around 4,000 people and 5,000 jobs.

References

Railway stations in Montérégie
Buildings and structures in Brossard
Transport in Brossard
Réseau express métropolitain railway stations
Railway stations scheduled to open in 2023